The black-tailed crake (Zapornia bicolor) is a species of bird in the family Rallidae. It is found in Bangladesh, Bhutan, China, India, Laos, Myanmar, Nepal, Thailand and Vietnam.

Description 
It is slate-gray with a chestnut brown back. Its eyes are red. Its slender legs are pinkish-red.

Its natural habitat is subtropical or tropical moist montane forests.

References

black-tailed crake
Birds of Eastern Himalaya
Birds of Myanmar
Birds of Laos
Birds of Yunnan
black-tailed crake
black-tailed crake
Taxonomy articles created by Polbot